In Greek mythology, Aglaurus (Ancient Greek: Ἄγλαυρος means 'dewfall') or Agraulus (means 'rustic one') was an Athenian princess.

Family 
Aglaurus was the daughter of King Cecrops and another Aglaurus, daughter of King Actaeus. She was the sister of Herse, Pandrosus and possibly, Erysichthon. Aglaurus had two offspring by two different gods, Alcippe (with Ares) and Ceryx (with Hermes). There were numerous versions of her myth.

Mythology
The earliest writer to mention her is Euripides in his play Ion, lines 22–23 and 484–485. In Moses Hadas and John Mclean's 1960 Bantam Classics translation they have Euripides say: 
"(Athena) gave Erichthonius to Aglaurus' daughters to keep"

Later, speaking of "a haunt of Pan": 

"There the daughters of Aglaurus still tread the measures of their dance, on the green lawns before the shrine of Pallas (Athena)"

In another version of the story, as told by the Bibliotheca, Hephaestus attempted to rape Athena but was unsuccessful. His semen fell on the ground, impregnating Gaia. Gaia did not want the infant Erichthonius, so she gave the baby to the goddess Athena. Athena gave the baby in a box to three women — Aglaurus and her two sisters — and warned them to never open it. Nonetheless, Aglaurus and Herse opened the box. The sight of the infant caused them both to go insane and they threw themselves off the Acropolis, or, according to Hyginus, into the sea.

An alternative version of the same story is that, while Athena was away bringing a limestone mountain from the Pallene peninsula to use in the Acropolis, the sisters, minus Pandrosus again, opened the box. A crow witnessed the opening and flew away to tell Athena, who fell into a rage and dropped the mountain (now Mt. Lykabettos). Once again, Herse and Aglaurus went insane and threw themselves to their deaths from a cliff.

Another legend represents Aglaurus in a totally different light. Athens was at one time involved in a long and protracted war, and an oracle declared that the war would cease if someone would sacrifice himself for the good of his country. Agraulos (as she is spelled in this version) came forward and threw herself off the Acropolis. The Athenians, in gratitude for this, built her a temple on the Acropolis, in which it subsequently became customary for the young Athenians, on receiving their first suit of armor, to take an oath that they would always defend their country to the last.

According to Ovid, Mercury loved Herse but her jealous sister, whom Ovid calls Aglauros, stood between them, barring Mercury's entry into the house and refusing to move. Mercury was outraged at her presumption and turned her to stone. It is in reference to this myth that Dante places her on the second terrace of Purgatory, alongside Cain, to serve as God's reins against jealousy.

Worship
One of the Attic demes (Agraule) derived its name from this heroine, and a festival and mysteries were celebrated at Athens in honor of her. According to Porphyry, she was also worshiped in Cyprus, where human sacrifices were offered to her down to a very late time. Mythographers believe Aglaurus to have an origin distinct from that of her sisters, due in part to the fact that she had her own sanctuary near the Acropolis, and unlike her sister Pandrosus, was more associated with young men or soldiers (epheboi) than with infants.  She was particularly associated with the festival of Athena called the Plynteria.

Gallery

Notes

References 

 Gaius Julius Hyginus, Fabulae from The Myths of Hyginus translated and edited by Mary Grant. University of Kansas Publications in Humanistic Studies. Online version at the Topos Text Project.
 Graves, Robert, The Greek Myths, Harmondsworth, London, England, Penguin Books, 1960. 
Graves, Robert, The Greek Myths: The Complete and Definitive Edition. Penguin Books Limited. 2017. 
Herodotus, The Histories with an English translation by A. D. Godley. Cambridge. Harvard University Press. 1920. . Online version at the Topos Text Project. Greek text available at Perseus Digital Library.
 Pausanias, Description of Greece with an English Translation by W.H.S. Jones, Litt.D., and H.A. Ormerod, M.A., in 4 Volumes. Cambridge, MA, Harvard University Press; London, William Heinemann Ltd. 1918. . Online version at the Perseus Digital Library
 Pausanias, Graeciae Descriptio. 3 vols. Leipzig, Teubner. 1903.  Greek text available at the Perseus Digital Library.
 Publius Ovidius Naso, Metamorphoses translated by Brookes More (1859-1942). Boston, Cornhill Publishing Co. 1922. Online version at the Perseus Digital Library.
 Publius Ovidius Naso, Metamorphoses. Hugo Magnus. Gotha (Germany). Friedr. Andr. Perthes. 1892. Latin text available at the Perseus Digital Library.
 Stephanus of Byzantium, Stephani Byzantii Ethnicorum quae supersunt, edited by August Meineike (1790-1870), published 1849. A few entries from this important ancient handbook of place names have been translated by Brady Kiesling. Online version at the Topos Text Project.

Metamorphoses characters
Princesses in Greek mythology
Women of Ares
Women of Hermes
Attican characters in Greek mythology
Deeds of Hermes
Deeds of Athena
Religion in ancient Athens
Metamorphoses into inanimate objects in Greek mythology